The Kingston Butter Factory is a community arts centre in Kingston, Queensland, Australia. It is located adjacent to the Kingston railway station. The factory underpinned the local dairying industry for six decades.

It is currently closed for redevelopment.  Original plans for an innovation hub were scrapped. The new plans include an outdoor staged area capable of holding 5,000 people.  A co-operative and historical society has temporarily relocated off-site.

History

The original building was first constructed in 1907. Construction was undertaken by Waugh and Josephson. The factory also made milk, cottage cheese and baker's cheese.  Until the late 1950s the factory was operated as a co-operative. The factory was patronized by the Australian businessmen and politician William Stephens.

Original plans for a manufacturing plant in the area emerged in 1900. The goal was to export products to Europe.  In 1906, a public meeting at Beenleigh Shire Hall saw  around 50 dairy farmers gather.  A ballot was held and a site near the railway with a good water supply was selected.  In 1911, a railway siding for the factory was built.  A modern brick building was built atop the old wooden structure in 1932.

The weekly output of butter was between 40 to 50 tonnes by 1930.  Peak production was reached in 1934.  In July 1950, the Kingston Butter Factory registered as a wholesale milk vendor.

The factory was closed in 1983.  After funding by Logan City Council in 1998 it was transformed into a community arts centre.  It was formerly home to a theatre company. The outdoor stage for entertainment launched in March 2022, with The Butterbox Theatre and Living Museum set to open mid-year 2022.

See also

Boonah Butter Factory

References 

Kingston, Queensland
1907 establishments in Australia
Industrial buildings in Queensland
Dairy buildings in Australia
Manufacturing plants in Australia